Winagami Lake Provincial Park is a provincial park in Alberta, Canada, located on three sides of Winagami Lake and accessible from Highway 2, about 30 km north of High Prairie. The park was established on November 13, 1956.

Winagami Wildland Park is an extension of the park.

See also
List of provincial parks in Alberta
List of Canadian provincial parks
List of National Parks of Canada

External links
Alberta Development - Winagami Lake Provincial Park
 Winagami Lake Provincial Park - Discover the Peace Country

Big Lakes County
Provincial parks of Alberta
Municipal District of Smoky River No. 130